Clanis mahadeva is a species of moth of the  family Sphingidae. It is known from India.

References

Clanis
Moths described in 1935